Sink with Kalifornija is a compilation album by the American punk rock band Youth Brigade. It was released in 1994 by the band's own label, BYO Records. It contains recordings from two of the band's earlier works; Sound & Fury (1983) and the EP What Price Happiness? (1984), as well as live tracks recorded at Fender's Ballroom in Long Beach, California in 1985.

The track "Did You Wanna Die" was played on the MTV series Jackass - during which three guys went snowboarding on the streets of San Francisco.

Track listing

Personnel
 Shawn Stern – vocals, guitar
 Adam Stern – bass
 Mark Stern – drums

References
"http://www.byorecords.com/index.php?page=one_band&aid=17&albumid=100057"

Youth Brigade (band) albums
1994 compilation albums
Punk rock compilation albums